The Iraq Division Three is a football league that is the fourth tier of the Iraqi football league system. The league consists of 173 teams and was founded in 1974.

League format 
The Division Three consists of 173 teams, Each group of teams affiliated to a governorate plays within that governorate, 38 teams are promoted to the Division Two on a 1 out of 5 system.

Current members 2021

Baghdad Province League

Kirkuk Province League

Mosul Province League

Saladin Province League

Diyala Province League

Anbar Province League

Karbala Province League

Babylon Province League

Wasit Province League

Qādisiyyah Province League

Dhi Qar Province League

Maysan Province League

Basra Province League

See also
 Iraqi Premier League
 Iraqi Super Cup
 Iraq FA Cup

References

External links
 Iraq Football Association

Football leagues in Iraq
Fourth level football leagues in Asia
Sports leagues established in 1974